Large neutral amino acids transporter small subunit 2 is a protein that in humans is encoded by the SLC7A8 gene.

See also
 Heterodimeric amino acid transporter
 Solute carrier family

References

Further reading

Solute carrier family